Tadhkirat al-Fuqahā (Memorandum for Jurists) is a book on Shiite jurisprudence written by Allamah Al-Hilli

Introduction
The book of Tadhkirat al-Fuqahā is considered one of the greatest books on Shiite jurisprudence or fiqh . The book is cited by other scholars as a reference. Allamah Hilli mainly points to opinions and ideas of Shaykh Tusi rather that of other Shiite Scholars.

Motive
The book was written by the request of Allamah Al-Hilli's son, Fakhr Al Muhaqqiq.

Style
Allamah Al-Hilli writes that his intention is to express and explain the summaries of indult (Fatwa) of the jurist and rules of Scholars (Ulama) according to "best explanations, the most correct way, the most rightness style, and the most confident methods".

Content
The author divided the book into four rules: on praying, on transactions, on unilateral obligation, on judgments. The book is divided to fifteen sections; some of them are as follows:
 The book of purity
 The books of Alms and fasting
 The book of safekeeping
 The book of buying either pecuniary or credit.

Characteristics
The book has many characteristics. Some of them are as follows:
 Refer to consensus (Ijma) as Jomhourat Al Ulama or most of the religious scholars.
 Documentation through Imam's narrations.
 Rejecting of juridical principles such as Istehsan and Qiyas.
 using of public resources.

Summaries
The book has been summarized by Ibn Motawwej Bahrani, one of the pupils of Allamah Al-Hilli, in a book called Mukhtasar Al Tadhkirah.

Publication
The book has published many times in Iraq and Iran. Until recently, the book was published in twelve volumes. Also, some part of Al Tadhkirah has published by Allameh Mozaffar and sayyed Mortaza Khalkhali in Najaf.

References

External links
 
 
 
 
 
 

Sharia
Jurisprudence
1997 books